Wijesinha is a Sinhalese surname. Notable people with the surname include:

Bertie Wijesinha (1920–2017), Ceylonese cricketer
Rajiva Wijesinha (born 1954), Sri Lankan writer

See also
 

Sinhalese surnames